Daniel During (6 October 1931 – 29 April 2015) was a South African cricketer. He played eight first-class matches for Border between 1952 and 1960.

References

External links
 

1931 births
2015 deaths
South African cricketers
Border cricketers
People from Qonce